Birdseed is an album by jazz saxophonist Lou Donaldson, his second recording for the Milestone label, featuring Donaldson with David Braham, Peter Bernstein, Fukushi Tainaka, and Ralph Dorsey.

The album was awarded 4 stars in an Allmusic review by Alex Henderson who states "Birdseed falls short of essential but is inspired and swinging".

Track listing 
All compositions by Lou Donaldson except as indicated
 "Cherry" (Don Redman) - 4:33  
 "Walkin' Again" - 6:56  
 "Pennies from Heaven" (Johnny Burke, Arthur Johnston) - 6:29  
 "Red Top" (Lionel Hampton, Ben Kynard) - 8:12  
 "Blue Bossa" (Kenny Dorham) - 5:45  
 "Back Door Blues" (Eddie "Cleanhead" Vinson) - 4:59  
 "Dorothy" (Rudy Nichols) - 5:22  
 "Birdseed" - 6:44  
 Recorded in New York City on April 28 & 29, 1992.

Personnel 
 Lou Donaldson - alto saxophone
 David Braham - organ
 Peter Bernstein - guitar
 Fukushi Tainaka - drums
 Ralph Dorsey - congas

References 

Lou Donaldson albums
1992 albums
Milestone Records albums